Enayatullah Enayat was Governor of Faryab Province in Afghanistan from 2003 until 2005, when he was appointed as Governor of Badghis Province. Enayat was later the governor of Samangan Province.

During the 2014 Afghan presidential election he ran as a candidate for the conservative Islamist Hezb-e Islami Gulbuddin party.

References

Governors of Badghis Province
Living people
Governors of Samangan Province
Governors of Faryab Province
Year of birth missing (living people)